National Route 436 is a national highway of Japan connecting Himeji, Hyōgo and Takamatsu, Kagawa in Japan, with a total length of 33.4 km (20.75 mi).

References

436
Roads in Hyōgo Prefecture
Roads in Kagawa Prefecture